Dismorphia lelex, the lelex mimic white, is a butterfly in the family Pieridae. It is found in Ecuador and Colombia.

Subspecies
The following subspecies are recognised:
Dismorphia lelex lelex (Ecuador, Colombia)
Dismorphia lelex xiomara Lamas, 2004 (Ecuador)

References

Dismorphiinae
Butterflies described in 1869
Pieridae of South America
Taxa named by William Chapman Hewitson